The Corpus Christi Coastal Classic is a college basketball tournament that started in 2013 played at the American Bank Center played in Corpus Christi, Texas.  Each team will play four games, the first two on campus sites and the final two rounds in Corpus Christi. The Semifinals and Finals of Hosts' bracket are televised on CBS Sports Network

2013

2014

2015 Bracket

References

2013 establishments in Texas
2015 disestablishments in Texas
Basketball in Texas
Sports in Corpus Christi, Texas
Sports competitions in Texas
College men's basketball competitions in the United States
College basketball competitions
Recurring sporting events established in 2013
Recurring sporting events disestablished in 2015